The Crimes of Petiot (Spanish:Los crímenes de Petiot) is a 1973 Spanish giallo film directed by José Luis Madrid and starring Paul Naschy, Patricia Loran and Fernando Marín.

Cast
 Paul Naschy as Boris Villowa / Padre de Marcel
 Patricia Loran as Vera 
 Fernando Marín as Heinrich Weiss 
 Anastasio Campoy as Comisario Wilhelm Rotwang  
 Lucía Prado as Madeleine  
 Ramón Lillo as Konrad Freund  
 Vicente Haro as Inspector Muller  
 María Pinar 
 Hugo Astar 
 Enrique San Francisco as Policía  
 Monika Rey 
 Maite Crespo 
 Víctor Iregua 
 Jesús Nieto as Marcel 9 años

References

Bibliography
 Steven Jay Schneider. Fear Without Frontiers: Horror Cinema Across the Globe. FAB, 2003.

External links 

1973 films
Spanish horror films
1973 horror films
Spanish crime films
1970s crime films
1970s Spanish-language films
Films directed by José Luis Madrid
Giallo films
1970s Spanish films
1970s Italian films
Crime horror films